20 Canum Venaticorum is a single variable star in the northern constellation of Canes Venatici, located 238 light years from the Sun. This object has the variable star designation AO Canum Venaticorum; 20 Canum Venaticorum is the Flamsteed designation. It is visible to the naked eye as a faint, white-hued star with a baseline apparent visual magnitude of +4.72. The star is moving further from the Earth with a heliocentric radial velocity of +9 km/s. Eggen (1971) listed this star as a member of the Hyades Stream.

However, it does not appear to be an Am star as the Calcium K line is normal. Earlier, Morgan and Abt (1972) assigned it a giant star class of F3 III. It is classified as a Delta Scuti type variable star with a single radial pulsation mode providing the best fit to the observed variation. Its brightness varies from magnitude +4.70 to +4.75 with a period of 2.92 hours.

20 Canum Venaticorum is 750 million years old with 2.43 times the mass of the Sun and 4 time the Sun's radius. It is radiating 63 times the Sun's luminosity from its photosphere at an effective temperature of 7,314 K.

References

F-type bright giants
F-type giants
Delta Scuti variables
Canes Venatici
Durchmusterung objects
Canum Venaticorum, 20
115604
064844
5017
Canum Venaticorum, AO